Don Adolfo Ruspoli y Godoy (di Bassano), de Khevenhüller-Metsch y Borbón, dei Principi Ruspoli (December 28, 1822 – February 4, 1914) was a Spanish aristocrat, son of the prince Camillo Ruspoli and wife Carlota de Godoy y Borbón, 2nd Duchess of Sueca.

He was 2nd Duke of Alcudia, Grandee of Spain First Class, with a Coat of Arms of de Godoy in succession of his maternal grandfather (Letter of February 18, 1853) and 3rd Count of Évoramonte in Portugal Portugal de Juro e Herdade with Honours of Relative, Maestrante of Granada, Gentleman of the Chamber of Her Catholic Majesty with exercise and service, Senator of the Realm, etc. And Prince of the Holy Roman Empire.

Marriage and children 
He married in Madrid, May 11, 1857 Doña Rosalía Álvarez de Toledo y Silva-Bazán, de Palafox-Portocarrero y Téllez-Girón (Naples, January 21/2, 1833 – Lucca, July/June 11, 1865), daughter of Don Pedro de Alcántara Álvarez de Toledo y Palafox, Gonzaga y Portocarrero, 17th Duke of Medina-Sidonia, Marquiss of Villafranca del Vierzo, 13th Marquis of Los Vélez,  and 21st Count of Niebla, Grandee of Spain First Classe. The first cousin of Eugenia de Montijo (Empress of the French), and wife Doña María del Pilar Joaquina de Silva-Bazán y Téllez-Girón, de Waldstein y Pimentel, of the Marqueses de Santa-Cruz, etc., and had five children:

 Carlos Ruspoli, 3rd Duke of Alcudia and Sueca
 Don Joaquín (Gioachino) Ruspoli y Álvarez de Toledo, de Godoy (di Bassano) y Silva-Bazán, dei Principi Ruspoli (Madrid, September 26, 1859 – 1904), unmarried and without issue
 Don José (Giuseppe) Ruspoli y Álvarez de Toledo, de Godoy (di Bassano) y Silva-Bazán, dei Principi Ruspoli (Madrid, August 21, 1861 – 1948), unmarried and without issue
 Doña María Teresa (Maria Tereza) Ruspoli y Álvarez de Toledo, de Godoy (di Bassano) y Silva-Bazán, dei Principi Ruspoli (Madrid, November 26, 1862/1863 – Paris, March 23, 1958) married in Paris, September 17, 1883 Henri Cognet de Chappuis de Maubou, Comte de Maubou, and had one son and one daughter:
 Jacques Cognet de Chappuis de Maubou, Vicomte de Maubou, without further notice
 Guillaumine "Mine" Cognet de Chappuis de Maubou, without further notice
 Don Camilo Ignacio (Camillo Ignacio) Ruspoli y Álvarez de Toledo, de Godoy (di Bassano) y Silva-Bazán, dei Principi Ruspoli (Pau, January 31, 1865 – Madrid, April 15, 1930)

See also 
 Ruspoli

References 
 Affonso, Domingos de Araújo and Valdez, Rui Dique Travassos, Livro de Oiro da Nobreza (3 volumes), Volume 1, p. 491-8, Lisbon, 1938
 Instituto de Salazar y Castro, Elenco de Grandezas y Titulos Nobiliarios Españoles, various (periodical publication)

External links 
 
 Adolfo Ruspoli y Godoy on a genealogical site
  http://www.grandesp.org.uk/historia/gzas/alcudiaduque.htm : § « II. Don Adolfo Rúspoli y Godoy, 2. duque de la ALCUDIA y Grande de España » (1822–1914)

1822 births
1914 deaths
Italian nobility
102
Adolfo
Adolfo
Grandees of Spain